Poonch or Punch (Prūntčh In Kashmiri) is a district in the Jammu Division of Jammu and Kashmir, India. With headquarters in the town of Poonch, it is bounded by the Line of Control (boundary between Indian and Pakistan administered Kashmir) on three sides (north, west and south). The 1947-48 war between India and Pakistan divided the earlier district into two parts. One went to Pakistan and the other became part of the then Indian state of Jammu and Kashmir.

Geography
The district is bordered by Kulgam district, Shopian district and Budgam district in the east, Rajouri district to the south and Baramulla district and Haveli district, Pakistan administered Jammu and Kashmir to the north and Poonch district, Pakistani administered Kashmir to the west.

Administration

The district headquarters is in the Poonch city. Mr Inder Jeet is the current District Magistrate. Presently, district Poonch in Jammu and Kashmir is divided into six tehsils:
 Haveli Tehsil
 Mandi Tehsil
 Mendhar Tehsil
 Surankote Tehsil
 Mankote Tehsil
 Balakote Tehsil

Each tehsil has its Tehsildar, who is the administrative head. The district is further divided into eleven. blocks: Poonch, Mandi, Loran Sathra Mendhar, Mankote Balakote, Surankote and Buffliaz. The administrative head of each block is the Block Development Officer (BDO). Each block consists of a number of panchayats. Recently added One Sub Division(Surnkote), other is Mendhar. Poonch district has a total of 179 villages.

Economy
In 2006 the Ministry of Panchayati Raj named Poonch one of the country's 250 most backward districts (out of a total of 640). It is one of the three districts in Jammu and Kashmir currently receiving funds from the Backward Regions Grant Fund Programme (BRGF).

Politics
Poonch district has 3 assembly constituencies: Surankote, Mendhar and Poonch Haveli. On 19 November 2018, the assembly was dissolved by Governor Satya Pal Malik. The former MLA of Poonch Haveli is Shah Mohammed Tantray of JKPDP, Mohammed Akram of Indian National Congress represented the Surankote constituency and Mendhar was represented by Javid Rana of Jammu & Kashmir National Conference. Poonch district comes in Jammu-Poonch Lok Sabha constituency. The present MP of Jammu–Poonch constituency is Jugal Kishore Sharma of the BJP.

Demographics

According to the 2011 census Poonch district, India has a population of 476,835, roughly equal to the nation of Suriname. This gives it a ranking of 548th in India (out of a total of 640). Its population growth rate over the decade 2001-2011 was 27.97%. Poonch has a sex ratio of 893 females for every 1000 males (which varies with religion), and a literacy rate of 68.69%. The district is 90.45% Muslim.

Religion 
, the proportions of different religions in the district were as follows: Islam (90.45%), Hinduism (6.84%), Sikhism (2.35%), Christianity (0.20%), not stated (0.15%), and others (0.02%).

Only 8.1% of the district's population lived in urban areas.  The proportions of religions in urban areas differed from the district as a whole, being: Islam (51.38%), Hinduism (32.82%), Sikhism (14.62%), Christianity (0.96%), not stated (0.20%), and others (0.03%).

Major clans and ethnicities include Gujjars, Bakerwals, Muslim Jats , Mughals, Syeds, Punjabis, Paharis, Kashmiris and Muslim Rajputs.  mostly reside on the slopes of mountains. The inhabitants typically cultivate small plots of land, and own some cattle. Gujjars and Bakerwals (nomadic tribes) speak Gojri, apart from Kashmiris the rest of the population speak Pahari-Pothwari, Poonchi, Kaghani besides Punjabi and only a minuscule population may be speaking Dogri.

Transportation

Air
The Poonch Airport is a non-operational airstrip located in Poonch which is mainly used by the Indian Army. The nearest airport is Sheikh ul-Alam International Airport in Srinagar which is located around 180 kilometres from Poonch town.

Rail
There is no railway connectivity to Poonch yet. There are plans to build the Jammu–Poonch line in the near future to connect Poonch with Jammu. The nearest major railway station is Jammu Tawi railway station which is located 235 kilometres from district headquarters Poonch.

Road
Poonch district is connected to the summer capital Jammu by the NH 144A alongside other intra-district roads. It also has road connectivity with Srinagar through the picturesque Mughal Road. There are plans to upgrade the existing NH 144A to four-lane for faster movement of traffic. A bus across the LOC, the Poonch–Rawalakot bus has helped to re-establish ties across the border.

Gallery

See also 
 1947 Poonch Rebellion
 1963 Poonch Indian Air Force helicopter crash
 Poonchi (disambiguation)
 Moghul road
 Pir Panjal
 Poonch Division (Pakistan)

References

External links 
 Official website of District Poonch
 2011 District Census Handbook

 
Districts of Jammu and Kashmir
Minority Concentrated Districts in India